The 2020 Cork Intermediate A Hurling Championship was the inaugural staging of the Cork Intermediate A Hurling Championship and the 111th staging overall of a championship for middle-ranking intermediate hurling teams in Cork. The draw for the group stage placings took place on 19 November 2019. The championship was scheduled to begin in April 2020, however, it was postponed indefinitely due to the impact of the COVID-19 pandemic on Gaelic games. The championship eventually began on 1 August 2020 and, after being suspended once again on 5 October 2020, ended on 7 August 2021.

On 7 August 2021, Éire Óg won the championship after a 2-16 to 1-17 defeat of Aghabullogue in the final at Páirc Uí Chaoimh. It was their third championship title overall and their first title since 1985.

Cormac Duggan was the championship's top scorer with 4-35.

Format change

On 26 March 2019, three championship proposals were circulated to Cork club delegates. A core element running through all three proposals, put together by the Cork GAA games workgroup, was that there be a group stage of 12 teams, straight relegation, and one team from the divisions/colleges section to enter at the preliminary quarter-final stage. On 2 April 2019, a majority of 136 club delegates voted for Option A which would see one round of games played in April and two more in August – all with county players available.

Team changes

From Championship 
Promoted to the Cork Premier Intermediate Hurling Championship
 Blackrock
Regraded to the Cork Lower Intermediate Hurling Championship

 Kilbrittain
 Tracton
 St Finbarrs
 Castlemartyr
 St Catherine’s
 Barryroe
 Ballymartle
 Grenagh
 Ballygarvan
 Milford
 Dripsey

Regraded to the South East Junior A Hurling Championship

 Ballinhassig

Regraded to the City Junior A Hurling Championship

 Na Piarsaigh

Participating teams

The club rankings were based on a championship performance 'points' system over the previous four seasons.

Results

Group 1

Table

Results

Group 2

Table

Results

Group 3

Table

Results

Relegation section

Table

Results

Playoff

Knockout stage

Quarter-finals

Semi-finals

Final

Championship statistics

Top scorers

Overall

In a single game

References

External links
 Cork GAA website

Cork Intermediate A Hurling Championship
Cork Intermediate Hurling Championship
Cork Championship